The Day of Wrath is the major-label debut album of the Italian thrash/black metal band Bulldozer, released on 13 March 1985.

Track listing
All songs written by Andy Panigada & AC Wild

Personnel
A.C. Wild – bass, vocals
Andy Panigada – rhythm & lead guitars
Don Andras – drums, percussion

Additional Musicians
Adriano Bosone – narration on "The Exorcism"
Dario Carria – bass on "Fallen Angel"

Production
Algy Ward – producer
Claudio Dentes – engineering

References

1985 debut albums
Bulldozer (band) albums
Roadrunner Records albums